Alexander Alan Johnston (born 17 March 1932) is a Scottish-Canadian professional golfer who played on the PGA Tour.

Johnston was born in Scotland. He came to Canada in 1954 and became a Canadian citizen, living in Montreal. He played on the PGA Tour in the 1960s and early 1970s, winning once. He won the 1962 Hot Springs Open Invitational in a playoff over Bill Collins.

Professional wins (2)

PGA Tour wins (1)

PGA Tour playoff record (1–0)

Other wins (1)
1965 Canadian Match Play

Team appearances
Canada Cup (representing Canada): 1961

References

Scottish male golfers
Canadian male golfers
PGA Tour golfers
Golfing people from Quebec
Sportspeople from Montreal
Anglophone Quebec people
1932 births
Living people